Theodore John Karras III (born March 15, 1993) is an American football center for the Cincinnati Bengals of the National Football League (NFL). He played college football at Illinois, and was drafted in sixth round of the 2016 NFL Draft by the New England Patriots, with whom he won two Super Bowl championships. He spent the 2020 season with the Miami Dolphins before returning to New England the next season.

Professional career

New England Patriots (first stint)

Karras was drafted by the New England Patriots in the sixth round (221st overall) in the 2016 NFL Draft. He made the Patriots 53-man roster and was the starting right guard in the season opener against the Cardinals due to the injuries of Shaq Mason and Jonathan Cooper. He split time with Mason in Week 2 but was reverted to a reserve role for the rest of the season after Mason resumed his starting role in Week 3. Karras contributed to the Patriots finishing with a 14–2 record and earning the top-seed for the AFC playoffs.

On February 5, 2017, Karras was part of the Patriots team that won Super Bowl LI. In the game, the Patriots defeated the Atlanta Falcons by a score of 34–28 in overtime.

On September 2, 2017, Karras was released by the Patriots and was signed to the practice squad the next day. He was promoted to the active roster on September 7, 2017. He made his first start of the season in Week 11 at center, filling in for starter David Andrews, who was out with an illness. Karras and the Patriots reached Super Bowl LII, but were defeated by the Philadelphia Eagles by a score of 41–33.

Karras entered 2018 as a backup guard and center. He started two games at right guard in place of an injured Shaq Mason. The Patriots reached Super Bowl LIII where they defeated the Los Angeles Rams 13–3.

Karras began the 2019 season as the Patriots' starting center after David Andrews was placed on season-ending injured reserve.

Miami Dolphins
On March 20, 2020, Karras signed a one-year contract with the Miami Dolphins. He started all 16 games at center for the Dolphins in 2020.

New England Patriots (second stint)
On March 19, 2021, Karras signed a one-year contract with the New England Patriots. After being named a backup guard to begin the season, he was named the starting left guard in Week 7 following a poor performance from Michael Onwenu and started the remainder of the season.

Cincinnati Bengals
On March 18, 2022, Karras signed a three-year, $18 million contract with the Cincinnati Bengals.

Personal life
Karras is a third-generation NFL player. His grandfather, Ted Karras Sr., and great uncles, Lou Karras and Alex Karras, played in the NFL during the 1950s and 1960s, and his father Ted Karras Jr. played during the 1987 season. He is also the seventh family member over three generations to play football in the Big Ten. Ted attended the same school, Saint Matthew Catholic School in Indianapolis, IN, (K-8) as Nick Martin of the Houston Texans, Zack Martin of the Dallas Cowboys, and Cap Boso of the Chicago Bears. His grandfather, his father, and Karras himself have all won NFL championships with the Bears, Redskins, and Patriots, respectively. Karras is a self-proclaimed fan of and trivia expert on ‘The Office’ TV series.

References

External links 
 Ted Karras college profile
 New England Patriots bio

1993 births
Living people
American football offensive linemen
Illinois Fighting Illini football players
Miami Dolphins players
New England Patriots players
Players of American football from Indianapolis
Cincinnati Bengals players
Karras football family